Prosperi is an Italian surname. Notable people with the name include:

 Cristine Prosperi, (1993), Canadian actress
 Franco Prosperi (1926 – 2004), Italian film director and screenwriter
 Franco E. Prosperi (born 1928), Italian  journalist, marine scientist, documentary director and producer
 Mauro Prosperi (1955), Italian police officer and pentathlete